Crapstone is a village in the county of Devon.

History
During the Second World War, Crapstone was the nearest village to RAF Harrowbeer. Members of the RAF crew were housed in the nearby villages of Crapstone, Yelverton and Buckland Monachorum. The Ministry of Defence maintained a defence site in Crapstone until the 1980s when the site was cleared and converted for residential use.

In 2007 Crapstone was used as the name of the village in a television advert for the RAC. Local residents started a protest group on the social networking site Facebook complaining that the village used in the television advert was not actually Crapstone but a location using its name.

In recent years the settlement has gained some notoriety due to its proximity to a dogging hotspot. 

As a child, Christopher Hitchens lived for some years in the village, and noted his embarrassment at the name in his autobiography, as well as in the pages of Vanity Fair. It has frequently been noted on lists of unusual place names. Other previous residents include singer Michael Ball and the writer Emma Smith.

Nearby villages include:
 Yelverton, Devon
 Milton Combe, Devon
 Buckland Monachorum

References

External links

Villages in Devon
Dartmoor